Robert Kennedy (born 23 June 1937) is a Scottish former footballer, who played as a wing half or full back.

Playing career
Bobby Kennedy started his career at Coltness United and after trials with Queen of the South and Clyde he joined Kilmarnock in 1957. While at Kilmarnock he overcame serious illness to continue his career, which included one cap for Scotland Under 23s. He returned to the Kilmarnock team which were Scottish League Division One and Scottish Cup runners-up in 1959–60 and Division One and Scottish League Cup runners-up in 1960–61.

In July 1961 Manchester City F.C. paid £45,000 for Kennedy after 85 games with Kilmarnock. He played for Manchester City for eight seasons, including the Division One championship-winning side in 1967–68 although he had not played enough games to qualify for a medal. He played 254 league and cup games, including European competitions, before he moved to Grimsby Town as player-manager for £9,000, where he played 88 first-team games.

Kennedy signed for Drogheda United in January 1973 and made his League of Ireland debut on 4 February at Lourdes Stadium .

On Saturday 16th October 2021, it was announced by Manchester City F.C, that Kennedy, along with fellow teammate Stan Horne and the families of fellow teammates, Harry Dowd and Paul Hince would be receiving winners medals for the Division One championship-winning season in 1967–68 during half-time at that days Premier League match against Burnley F.C at the Etihad Stadium, after the club’s official request to the EFL, that medals be awarded to Stan, Paul, Bobby and posthumously to Harry, was approved in January 2021.

The medals were presented by Manchester City Ambassador and former teammate of the recipients, Mike Summerbee.

Managerial career
Kennedy became player-manager at Grimsby Town in 1969. Grimsby had to apply for re-election in Kennedy's first season as they came 23rd in Division Four. In the following two seasons, Grimsby came 16th and 19th, before Kennedy resigned in May 1971.

He became Bradford City's coach and youth team manager, before he had a brief spell with Dundalk. He returned to Bradford, first at City then as honorary manager at Bradford Park Avenue. He returned to Bradford City for a third time in January 1975 when he succeeded Bryan Edwards as manager. He led City to 10th in Division Four in his first season before becoming the club's first manager of the month in January 1976. The club also reached the quarter-finals of the FA Cup in the same year. Further awards followed as he helped the club to promotion to Division Three in 1976–77. He was sacked in January 1978 in the middle of a seven-game losing streak.

He became coach at Blackburn Rovers before leaving football altogether.

Managerial statistics

After football
Kennedy and his family remained in Bradford while owning various clothing shops along with his wife, Barbara, in Manchester and the North West of England. 

His daughter, Lorraine, was also a football player, playing as a forward for Bradford City Women's FC and at international level for Scotland, before moving into coaching and managing Bradford City Women's FC. His son, Graeme, played football to a semi-professional level, as a goalkeeper, before coaching at the academies of FC Halifax Town and currently, Bradford City A.F.C

References

External links

1937 births
Living people
Scottish footballers
Kilmarnock F.C. players
Manchester City F.C. players
Grimsby Town F.C. players
Scottish football managers
Grimsby Town F.C. managers
Bradford City A.F.C. managers
Scottish Football League players
English Football League players
Footballers from Motherwell
Scotland under-23 international footballers
Drogheda United F.C. players
League of Ireland players
Newmains United Community F.C. players
Association football fullbacks
Association football wing halves